Thokar also called The Kick is  1939 Hindi/Urdu film directed by A. R. Kardar. Produced by Chandulal Shah for his production banner Ranjit Movietone, it had music by Gyan Dutt. The story writer was M. Sadiq, with cinematography by Gordhanbhi Patel. The cast included Kumar, Ishwarlal, Madhuri, Yakub, Noor Mohammed Charlie, Ram Marathe, Waheedan Bai and Dixit.

Thokar is cited as one of the "most interesting" films made by Kardar for Ranjit Movietone. The other was Pagal (1940).
The story involved a blind villager winning a lottery but he eventually realises that money can not bring happiness. Baburao Patel, editor of the cine magazine Filmindia, called it one of the "good social pictures" and "the best" from Chandulal Shah.

Plot
Mohan is a poor blind villager taking care of his ward Radha, who is in love with him. The village tramp, Ramesh (Charlie) sells him a lottery ticket. To Mohan's astonishment, he wins the sweep-stakes but Ramesh wants his share. Ramesh takes Mohan to the city with the intention of getting his eyes treated. In the city, Ramesh deviously gets Mohan married off to a prostitute who is having an affair with Ramesh. When Mohan's eyesight is restored, he sees his wealth diminishing, and an adulterous wife. He takes revenge on Ramesh and his wife. Mohan finally returns to the village and to Radha.

Cast
 Ishwarlal
 Madhuri as Radha
 Kumar as Mohan
 Charlie as Ramesh
 Yakub
 Waheedan Bai
 Dixit
 Ram Marathe
 Suresh
 K. N. Singh
 Wasti

Soundtrack
Charlie has been cited as "the first (Indian) comedian to have songs picturised on him", starting the trend with the song from Thokar, "Jab Se Mali Teri Khak". The music was composed by Gyan Dutt and the lyricist was Pyare Lal Santoshi. The singers were Waheedan Bai, Suresh, Ram Marathe and Charlie.

Song List

References

External links
 

1939 films
Films scored by Gyan Dutt
1930s Hindi-language films
Films directed by A. R. Kardar
Indian black-and-white films